Benoit Dalibard (born 26 March 1991 in Pencran, France) is a French footballer who plays as a defender but is without a club after leaving Hereford United.

Career
Dalibard started his career with En Avant de Guingamp but failed to make a first team appearance for the club. He signed for League Two side Hereford United in August 2011 on a short-term deal but his time at the club was disrupted through injury. He made his professional debut for the club on 20 August 2011, in a 1–1 draw with AFC Wimbledon, being replaced in the first half by Kenny Lunt. In October 2011 he extended his stay at Edgar Street until January 2012 when he then agreed a new eighteen-month contract with the club.

However Dalibard left Hereford United by mutual consent on 4 September 2012 in order to return home to France.

References

External links

1991 births
Living people
French footballers
Association football midfielders
Hereford United F.C. players
English Football League players